Wafande Pierre Jolivel Zahor (born 21 January 1983), better known by his mononym Wafande, is a Danish singer and songwriter of African-French descent, in the field of reggae, soul and urban-hit tunes and is a true influencer in the nature of the word. These factors are reflected in his music and personality and have made him famous in Denmark. He is signed to Universal Music.

Life
Wafande, born to an African father, a musician, and a Danish-French mother has roots in Denmark, France, Tanzania, Congo, Malawi and Oman. He was born with music in his blood. "My father was a musician, he was a blues singer. I grew up with a lot of Ray Charles, and Billie Holiday, Otis Redding, Sam Cooke, Big Mama Thornton. My dad used to play everything. He had a huge record collection. I remember I had a lot of fun with that record player."

He grew up in Freetown Christiania, a neighborhood in Copenhagen, Denmark. Wafande moved with his family to France when he was 8 years old.
For some years, Wafande's studies and his basketball skills took the upper hand, but at the point when real choices had to be made, Wafande chose his music career over the one as an elite basketball player. "I couldn't do basketball practice five times a week while out playing gigs in the weekends", Wafande explains. The music choice paid off; Wafande's track record of so far is three platinum and two gold singles and two top ten solo albums of which one gold.  
Wafande's first hit came in 2011 with the platinum summer No. 1 single ’Gi’ Mig Et Smil’, produced by Pharfar and Fresh-I.
More hit certifications followed; ‘En Anden’ (platinum) ’Uartig’ (2× platinum) debut album ‘Du Ved Det’ (gold), ‘Django (Klar På Noget Dumt)’ (gold) and ‘Se Mig I Dag’ (gold).

In 2015 Wafande released the EP "Grand Danois" and the hit single "Himlen For Mig Selv" going straight to 'Ugens Uundgåelige' on Danish Radio P3 (powerplay) and topped the charts for weeks. Same year Wafande started a new project Black Dylan with producer Nuplex reaching the international scene, going straight to BBC Radio 2 playlist. They have played several international live shows, including a show at London's Ronnie Scott's, London Jazz Festival and Eurosonic to name a few.  Wafande has been a coach on TV2 Voice Junior for six seasons in a row, further establishing him as one of Denmark's biggest and most loved personalities. In 2019, he is releasing a new Danish project with his long time friend and popular singer, Shaka Loveless and also several international releases, most recently with the producer duo Hyperclap, which has been playlisted to the German national radio station N-Joy. On top of that, Wafande has been working hard in sessions in Europe, USA and Bahamas, resulting in a strong batch of new tracks, ready for the international scene.
Wafande has done charity work with numerous foundations such as Red Cross, WWF, the homeless, children with cancer, and more.

Lak orale min bror, dol din go

Discography

Albums

EP'er
· Grand Danois (2015)

Singles

References

External links
 
 

Danish male singer-songwriters
Reggae musicians
Living people
Musicians from Copenhagen
1983 births
21st-century Danish male singers